Coleophora tollamseliella is a moth of the family Coleophoridae. It is found in Afghanistan, Turkmenistan, Iran, Pakistan and Turkey.

References

tollamseliella
Moths of Asia